Leuprorelin/norethisterone acetate, also known as leuprolide/norethindrone acetate and sold under the brand name Lupaneta Pack, is a co-packaged medication used to treat endometriosis. It contains leuprorelin as the acetate, a gonadotropin-releasing hormone agonist, and norethisterone acetate, a progestin. The leuprorelin is given by intramuscular injection and the norethisterone acetate is taken by mouth.

The co-packaged medication was approved for medical use in the United States in December 2012.

Medical uses 
Leuprorelin/norethisterone acetate is indicated for the initial management of the painful symptoms of endometriosis and for management of recurrence of symptoms.

References

Further reading 
 

Combination drugs
GnRH agonists
Progestogens